Rediscovered is an Andreas Johnson studio album, released on 29 October 2008.

Track listing
It Don't Mean a Thing
Route 66
Do You Wanna Dance
Smile
Glorious
Night And Day
Can't Take My Eyes Off You
Night Stood Still
Waterloo
Sign Your Name
The Girl I Love

Contributors
Andreas Johnson - vocals
Anders Kjellberg - drums
Kaspar Vadsholt - bass
Magnus Persson - percussion
Georg Wadenius - guitar
Marcoss Ubeda - piano

Chart positions

References

External links

2008 albums
Andreas Johnson albums